The Web of Fear is the partly missing fifth serial of the fifth season of the British science fiction television series Doctor Who, which was first broadcast in six weekly parts from 3 February to 9 March 1968.

The serial is set on the London Underground railway over forty years after the 1967 serial The Abominable Snowmen. In the serial, the incorporeal Great Intelligence leads the time traveller the Second Doctor (Patrick Troughton) into a trap where it can drain the Doctor's mind of all of his knowledge. This serial marked the last regular appearance of the Yeti, although they would return for small cameos in The Five Doctors and the Reeltime Pictures spin-off Downtime.

The Web of Fear marks the first appearance of actor Nicholas Courtney as Colonel Alistair Lethbridge-Stewart, subsequently better known as the Brigadier, and acts as a precursor to the numerous later serials involving the UNIT organisation.

Only five of the six episodes are held in the BBC Archives; one still remains missing.

For decades, all but episode 1 were thought to have been destroyed, but on 11 October 2013, the BBC announced the previously missing episodes 2 and 4-6 were recovered from Nigeria. Episode 3, however, was reportedly stolen by a private collector on its way back to the UK, so an animated reconstruction had to be made for episode 3. On 16 August 2021, a special edition Blu-ray and DVD release of the serial saw the missing episode reconstructed using 3D motion capture animation, a first for missing episodes.

Plot

Following the events at the end of The Enemy of the World, Jamie manages to close the TARDIS' doors, stabilising its flight. The TARDIS stalls in flight, however, as it is enshrouded in a web-like substance. The web clears, and the ship lands in a deserted Covent Garden tube station. The city outside appears completely abandoned.

Approximately 40 years after The Abominable Snowmen, an elderly Professor Travers accidentally reactivates a control sphere. The sphere inserts itself into an intact robot Yeti from Tibet at a private collection in London and escapes. In the following days, London is beset by thick fog and a deadly web-like fungus. Professor Travers is brought to the Second World War deep-level shelter under Goodge Street tube station, where his daughter Anne has asked for his help to defeat the menace.

Moving through the underground train tunnels, the Second Doctor and his companions encounter the military, who are trying to stem the spread of the fungus by demolishing tunnels with explosives. Explosives laid at Charing Cross tube station are neutralised by the robot Yeti by smothering the explosion with the fungus. The reappearance of the Yeti signifies to the Doctor that the Great Intelligence has returned. While others in the shelters are suspicious of the Doctor and his companions, Professor Travers, recognising them from their encounter in Tibet, convinces Captain Knight that the Doctor will be key to defeating the Yeti.

The group are joined by Colonel Lethbridge-Stewart and Private Evans, the sole survivors of an ammunition detail which was attacked by Yeti. Lethbridge-Stewart assumes command. The web suddenly speeds up its expansion, engulfing the whole of the Circle Line within minutes. Further attempts to use explosives to halt the web are blocked by Yeti attacks, and the military's explosives store is consumed by the fungus. The Doctor discovers a Yeti-attracting beacon at the scene, showing someone at HQ must be in league with the Intelligence. Meanwhile, Harold Chorley, the only journalist allowed to report on the crisis, is told of the TARDIS by Victoria and he rushes off to Covent Garden to find it and escape. The base is attacked by Yeti, killing several of the soldiers and knocking out Anne and Professor Travers. The Yeti leave with Professor Travers' unconscious body.

The Doctor informs Lethbridge-Stewart and Knight about the intelligence and the TARDIS; the Colonel decides to recover the TARDIS from Covent Garden station, hoping that it will allow them to escape. The Colonel fails to lead the remaining troops overground to Covent Garden; despite downing several robots in the ensuing battle, all except Lethbridge-Stewart perish. Staff-Sergeant Arnold vanishes into the fungus while delivering a baggage trolley to the Colonel.

The Doctor and Anne plan to build a control box to block the Intelligence's control signal, though the Doctor finds that they are low on components and is escorted above ground by Knight to find more. Knight is killed by a Yeti, though the robots leave the Doctor alone. He discovers a Yeti beacon in Knight's pocket. Later, the Colonel returns to HQ alone where the Doctor finds a model Yeti in his pocket, too. Based on this, the Doctor concludes the traitor is still active in HQ. At that moment, two Yeti break in with Professor Travers, who is possessed by the Great Intelligence.

The Great Intelligence explains that it brought the Doctor to London in order to drain his mind of all his knowledge. He is given 20 minutes to submit, else it will drain the minds of Jamie and Victoria instead. Travers is taken as a hostage by the Yeti along with Victoria, and released from control. The Doctor and Anne work on the control box further and successfully reprogram a control sphere, which they load into a disabled Yeti to make a covert, voice-controlled ally.

A dishevelled and bleeding Staff-Sergeant Arnold meets the Colonel and Jamie in the tunnels. All three agree to return to HQ to support the Doctor, though they find that he and Anne have left. At that moment, the fungus bursts through the walls of HQ, swamping Goodge Street shelter. They escape, and meet up with the Doctor and Anne, before the group is ambushed by the Yeti and herded to Piccadilly tube station. Arnold slips away and meets Chorley, who has been wandering the tube network and has become hysterical with fright.

At the ticket hall of Piccadilly station, the group rejoins with Travers and Victoria. Chorley and Arnold appear and Arnold is revealed to be the traitor, having been killed and his corpse reanimated as a vessel for the Intelligence. The Doctor appears to submit to the Intelligence and places himself inside a pyramid-shaped machine that the Intelligence intends to use to drain his mind. Just as the Doctor is apparently about to have his mind drained, Jamie calls out to the servile Yeti to attack Arnold; Jamie, Anne and Professor Travers try to drag the Doctor from the machine against his wishes. After Jamie rips its wiring out, the pyramid explodes and the Yeti and Arnold fall to the floor, lifeless without the influence of the Great Intelligence, which has now been dispersed back into space. Everyone is happy except for the Doctor. He explains that he had sabotaged the conversion headset and would have drained the Intelligence had the device been used – but now the Intelligence is free once more. After saying goodbye, the Doctor, Jamie and Victoria slip away and head back to the TARDIS.

Production
 

 Episode is missing

Patrick Troughton took a week's holiday during the rehearsals and recording of Episode 2. Consequently, the Doctor appears only in the reprise from Episode 1, and the Doctor's first meeting with Lethbridge-Stewart takes place off screen.

The Tube sets were reportedly so accurate that the BBC was accused of illegally filming on London Underground property. According to the director permission was sought from London Transport to film in the Underground but the fees they would have charged to do so were unmanageably expensive.  Several props were reused from the previous Yeti serial, including control spheres and model Yeti.

This would be the final Doctor Who serial in which 35 mm film would be used for location filming.  Starting with the next story, 16 mm film would be used instead.

Cast notes
David Langton was originally cast as Lethbridge-Stewart, but he pulled out before rehearsals and Nicholas Courtney (originally cast as Captain Knight) was given the part instead. However, it is an extra named Maurice Brooks who is first seen in the role, his booted feet appearing briefly late in Episode Two. Actor Nicholas Courtney previously appeared in a different role, that of Bret Vyon, in The Daleks' Master Plan (1965–66). Actor Richardson Morgan went on to appear in the Fourth Doctor serial The Ark in Space.

Missing episodes

For over forty years only episode 1 of the story and a few clips of the other episodes survived in the BBC Archives, the others being presumed lost.
The clips are those that were censored and physically cut from the film by the New Zealand authorities when they purchased the rights to broadcast the story.

In October 2013, the BBC announced that copies of episodes 2, 4, 5 and 6 had been found in Nigeria by Television International Enterprises Archive/Philip Morris, and returned to the BBC Archives.
Episode 3 of The Web of Fear was originally among the discovered episodes, but went missing in the months between the discovery of the films and their return to the BBC. Morris later said it was most likely the episode had been sold to a collector by a member of staff. 

On 23 November 2020, the BBC released a special trailer confirming that the episode would be animated for a DVD and Blu-ray release in 2021.

The original DVD release of this story features episode 3 presented in tele-snap format, with the surviving off-air soundtrack.

The missing third episode was re-created using animation for a new release of the serial. The special edition was released on 16 August 2021.

Advertising

A week before Episode 1 was shown, BBC1 broadcast a special trailer following Episode 6 of The Enemy of the World, featuring the Doctor (Patrick Troughton) warning viewers about the new, more frightening versions of the Yeti. Only the audio for this trailer survives. It was officially reconstructed by the BBC using animation to tease the animated release of Episode 3.

Commercial releases

In print

A novelisation of this serial, written by Terrance Dicks, was published by Target Books in August 1976, entitled Doctor Who and The Web of Fear.

Home media

Audio 
The audio soundtrack, along with additional linking narration by Frazer Hines, has been released on MP3 CD.

Video 
In 2003, Episode 1 of this story and episodes 1 & 3 of The Faceless Ones were the final episodes of Doctor Who to be released on VHS by BBC Worldwide. Episode 1 and the surviving clips were released on DVD in the United Kingdom in November 2004 in the three-disc Lost in Time set.

On 11 October 2013, the newly recovered episodes were released on iTunes along with the original episode 1 and a reconstruction of episode 3 from telephotos and the original soundtrack. This version was also made available on Virgin Media's on demand service, together with numerous other stories, as part of the show's 50th anniversary commemoration.

A DVD of the story was released on 24 February 2014 and was the best selling DVD of Classic Doctor Who.

On 23 November 2020 it was announced that The Web of Fear will be released in 2021 on DVD and Blu-ray with the missing Episode 3 now animated. The special edition was released on 16 August 2021.

Notes

References

External links

Photonovel of The Web of Fear on the BBC website
Doctor Who Locations – The Web of Fear

Target novelisation

On Target — Doctor Who and the Web of Fear

Second Doctor serials
Doctor Who missing episodes
Doctor Who stories set on Earth
Doctor Who serials novelised by Terrance Dicks
1968 British television episodes
Yeti in fiction
London Underground in popular culture
Television episodes set in London